The Gynecologic Oncology Group (GOG) is a non-profit organization funded by the National Cancer Institute with the purpose of supporting research for the prevention and treatment of all gynecologic cancers, such as ovarian cancer, cervical cancer, endometrial cancer, vulvar cancer, and vaginal cancer.

The GOG was founded in 1970 by a group of gynecologic surgeons from 11 institutions.  The formation of the GOG was the result of the recognition of the need for collaborative research in the gynecologic malignancies.  Before the GOG was founded, most clinical trials were small studies from single institutions or case reports and lacked the statistical power to convince physicians around the world to adopt innovative treatment strategies.  The GOG has now grown to include over 50 research centers and has over 160 affiliated institutions.  Its members make up a multi-disciplinary group, consisting of gynecologic oncologists, medical oncologists, pathologists, radiation oncologists, nurses, statisticians, and basic scientists.

Over 3,000 patients are treated each year on GOG protocols. As of 2004, the GOG has completed over 300 trials and published over 550 papers.

References

External links 
 Official website

Cancer organizations based in the United States
Obstetrics and gynaecology organizations
Clinical trial organizations